Liza Kennedy (born July 5, 1989), better known by her stage name Liza (often stylized as LIZA), is a Japanese fashion model.

Early life
Liza Kennedy was born in Hamburg, Germany, to a Japanese mother and a Scottish German father. She went to a German school in Japan. Liza's background made her trilingual (English, German and Japanese).

Career
At age 13, Liza was scouted as a model for JJ and started modeling for the magazine. After that, she became an exclusive model for the Oggi magazine.

She released the first DVD, Liza, on Pony Canyon in 2007.

As a fashion model, Liza has appeared in Tokyo Girls Collection in 2009, 2010, 2011 and 2012.

She has also been a presenter for several television programs such as Terebi de Doitsugo, Another Sky and Kiseki Taiken! Unbelievable.

References

External links
 Official website

Japanese female models
Japanese people of Scottish descent
People from Tokyo
1989 births
Living people